Crazy Crazy Feeling is a 2019 Telugu-language romantic comedy film directed by Sanjai Kartik and starring Viswant Duddumpudi and Palak Lalwani in the lead roles.

Plot 
The plot revolves around a youthful couple (Abhi and Spandana) who fall in love and problems that arise in their relationship.

Cast  
 Viswant Duddumpudi as Abhi
Palak Lalwani as Spandana
 Vennela Kishore as Maheshwar Rao
 Saranya Pradeep as Swapna
 Suman as Abhi's father
 Jaya Prakash Reddy as Dream father
 Posani Krishna Murali as Director PK 
 Krishnam Raju as Writer
 Gundu Sudharshan
 Suman Shetty
 Bhadram
 Chammak Chandra

Production  
Ad film director  Sanjai Kartik first narrated the script to Vijay Deverakonda after the release of Yevade Subramanyam (2015). Deverakonda was unable to sign the film due to his busy schedule and was replaced by  Viswant Duddumpudi. Palak Lalwani was signed as the actress and Vennela Kishore for the comical portions.

Release 
The film was originally scheduled to release on 22 February. 123 Telugu opined that "On the whole, Crazy Crazy Feeling is routine romantic drama which has a strict few good moments".

References

External links 

Indian romantic comedy-drama films
2019 romantic comedy-drama films
2010s Telugu-language films